Talawade is an industrial area in the Haveli taluka in Pimpri Chinchwad located near Pune in Maharashtra, India. It is a well developed industrial area with a large number of industries, and is the location of an information technology park.

References

Villages in Pune district